Copmanhurst is a small town in Clarence Valley Council, Northern Rivers region, New South Wales, Australia.

References

,

Localities in New South Wales
Clarence Valley Council